Frank E. Brogger (June 11, 1923 – July 23, 1988) was a minor league baseball player and an American football player and coach.  He served as the head football coach at St. Ambrose University in Davenport, Iowa from 1951 to 1954 after having been a high school coach in the Saginaw, Michigan area.

Brogger spent one season with the York White Roses of the Class B Interstate League in 1944.

Head coaching record

College

References

1923 births
1988 deaths
American football ends
Baseball pitchers
Michigan State Spartans football players
St. Ambrose Fighting Bees football coaches
York White Roses players
High school football coaches in Michigan
Sportspeople from Saginaw, Michigan
Players of American football from Michigan